Lieutenant General Theodoros Pangalos (11 January 1878 – 26 February 1952) was a Greek general, politician and dictator. A distinguished staff officer and an ardent Venizelist and anti-royalist, Pangalos played a leading role in the September 1922 revolt that deposed King Constantine I and in the establishment of the Second Hellenic Republic. In June 1925 Pangalos staged a bloodless coup, and his assumption of power was recognized by the National Assembly which named him Prime Minister. As a "constitutional dictator" he ruled the country until his overthrow in August 1926. From April 1926 until his deposition, he also occupied the office of President of the Republic.

Pangalos withdrew from public life for a while, but remained active in the Venizelist military circles. During the Axis Occupation of Greece, Pangalos and military officers close to him played a role in the establishment of the Security Battalions. He was widely suspected of collaboration with the Germans. Cleared by a postwar court, he ran unsuccessfully for political office and died in 1952.

Early career

Pangalos was born on the island of Salamis on 11/23 January 1878. His mother was descendant of the local Arvanite fighter of the Greek Revolution, Giannakis Meletis (Hatzimeletis), while his paternal side came from an aristocratic family of Kea island.

He graduated from the Greek Army Academy on 16/29 July 1900 as an Infantry Second Lieutenant, and continued his studies in Paris, France.

During the Balkan Wars of 1912–13 he served as a staff officer in the 6th Infantry Division. He was head of the forces that entered Sidirokastro (Demir Hisar) during the second Balkan war.

In 1916 he joined Eleftherios Venizelos' Provisional Government of National Defence against King Constantine I, and was tasked with recruiting the 9th Cretan Regiment for the new government. He did not have a chance to lead it to battle though, because when King Constantine abdicated and Venizelos took over the governance of all of Greece in June 1917, he was appointed chief of the personnel department in the Ministry of Military Affairs. In early 1918 he went to the front as Chief of Infantry of the 1st Infantry Division in the Strymon sector of the Macedonian front. In late 1918 he was appointed chief of staff of the General Headquarters, holding the post until the electoral victory of the pro-royalist and anti-Venizelist United Opposition in November 1920, when he was dismissed from the army.

In 1922, Pangalos supported the 11 September 1922 Revolution, led by Nikolaos Plastiras, which abolished the monarchy and declared the Second Hellenic Republic, and played a major role in the rapid establishment of the regime in Athens, while Plastiras and the army were still sailing from Chios. His first job was to prosecute a number of prominent pro-monarchist government leaders by military court in what became known as the Trial of the Six. On 14/27 November he was named Minister for Military Affairs and tasked with reorganizing the Greek army in Macedonia and Thrace, as the war with Turkey was not over, and an attack in the region was feared to be imminent. The reorganization of the "Army of Evros", which he commanded from mid-December, was so successful that the Greek High Command prepared for a possible advance into Eastern Thrace in the face of the Turkish demands in the Lausanne peace talks. The military threat posed by Pangalos' army helped the Turks back down, and the Treaty of Lausanne was signed.

A staunch nationalist, Pangalos objected to the terms of the treaty, and declared that his troops would attack Turkey nonetheless in order to block the deal. He was forced to resign, but his stance made him popular with the many segments of Greek society that objected to the treaty. During the period of political instability that followed, Pangalos jumped into the fray, gaining and losing a number of ministerial positions as governments came and went.

He assisted in the suppression of the failed Leonardopoulos–Gargalidis coup d'état attempt in October 1923, and was elected to Parliament for Thessaloniki in December. He was appointed Minister for Public Order in the cabinet of Alexandros Papanastasiou on 31 March 1924, holding the post until 18 June, when he became once more Minister for Military Affairs, retaining the post until the cabinet's resignation on 25 July 1924.

In power

On June 24, 1925, officers loyal to Pangalos, fearing that the political instability was putting the country at risk, overthrew the government in a coup and forced President Pavlos Kountouriotis to appoint Pangalos as Prime Minister. Pangalos immediately abolished the young republic and began to prosecute anyone who could possibly challenge his authority, including his old chief, Plastiras. Freedom of the press was abolished, and a number of repressive laws were enacted (including a law dictating the length of women's skirts - no more than 30 cm above the ground), while Pangalos awarded himself the Grand Cross of the Order of the Redeemer. Pangalos declared a state of emergency on 3 January 1926 and assumed dictatorial powers.  In April 1926, he had himself elected president as well in a rigged election. On the economic front Pangalos attempted to devalue the currency by ordering paper notes cut in half.

His political and diplomatic inability however became soon apparent. He conceded too many rights to Yugoslav commerce in Thessaloniki, but worst of all, he embroiled Greece in the so-called War of the Stray Dog, harming Greece's already strained international relations. Soon, many of the officers that had helped him come to power decided that he had to be removed. Regarding relations with Turkey, he still was not agreed with the treaty of Lausanne and tried to form an alliance with fascist Italy in a war against Turkey, with no success.

On 29 August 1926, a counter-coup led by General Georgios Kondylis deposed him, and Kountouriotis returned as president, while Pangalos was imprisoned for two years in the Izzeddin Fortress.

After his rule
In 1930, Pangalos was sent to prison for a building scandal. He remained in prison for two years and was released during a period when a number of amnesties were given by Venizélos. He never regained the popular support he had before the coup, and never again played a role in Greek politics. After Greece fell to the Germans in 1941, Pangalos and other Venizelist officers moved to support the new collaborationist regime. He also played an important role, albeit from behind the stage, in the establishment of the Security Battalions, which he hoped to use against both the Communist-dominated National Liberation Front and against a possible return of King George II and the royal government from exile. Ambitious, tough and able, Pangalos was also widely distrusted for his rashness, megalomania and for being generally "half mad". Through Pangalos did not formally take a position with the Security Battalions, but he ensured his followers were given key positions in the Security Battalions. Pangalos was especially close to SS-Standartenführer Walter Blume, who was regarded as the most extreme and violent of all the SS leaders in Greece. Blume intrigued in the summer of 1944 to have Pangalos appointed prime minister of the puppet Hellenic State to replace Ioannis Rallis, who was very close to a nervous breakdown by that point. After liberation, Pangalos was arrested and put in Averof prison in Athens waiting trial for collaboration, but was cleared of all charges in September 1945. He unsuccessfully ran for parliament in 1950 and died in Kifissia two years later.

His grandson, also named Theodoros Pangalos, served as the Deputy Prime Minister of Greece. He is a member of the PASOK socialist party.

In popular culture
Theodoros Pangalos is mentioned in the song Stin epohi tou Pangalou (In the times of Pangalos) by Giorgos Mitsakis, originally sung by George Dalaras.

References

Works cited

External links
 

|-

1878 births
1952 deaths
20th-century presidents of Greece
20th-century prime ministers of Greece
Republicanism in Greece
People from Salamis Island
Hellenic Army lieutenant generals
Leaders who took power by coup
Ministers of Military Affairs of Greece
Prime Ministers of Greece
Presidents of Greece
Arvanites
Greek collaborators with Nazi Germany
Greek military personnel of World War I
Greek military personnel of the Balkan Wars
Greek military personnel of the Greco-Turkish War (1919–1922)
Greek anti-communists
History of Greece (1924–1941)
Prisoners and detainees of Greece
Greek prisoners and detainees